Avinashi (previously known as Thirupukkoliyur) is a Special Grade Town Panchayat in Tiruppur district in the Indian state of Tamil Nadu. Avinashi is one among the nine taluks of the district. It is one of the popular pilgrim destinations in Western Tamilnadu region. It is located on National Highway NH544, which bypasses the town. The history of the town is centered around the Avinasilingeswarar temple. The town was previously a part of the Coimbatore district until Tirupur was carved out as a separate district from the erstwhile districts of Coimbatore and Erode. It is a stopping place for vehicles travelling from the western part of Tamil Nadu to Chennai and Cochin.

Etymology
The word Avinashi means "indestructible", referring to the God of the Avinashi Temple. It was previously known as Thirupukkoliyur . Thiru means "grace of God" and Pukkoliyur means "a place of refuge". It is said that once Devas took shelter in this temple in fear of Asuras.
 
"Vinasam" in Tamil means "Destruction".  Prefixing with 'A' means 'No-destruction'.  Avinashi is "a place which doesn't have any destruction by any means".

History
Avinashi is part of the ancient Kongunadu region, which now comprises the districts of Tiruppur, Coimbatore, Erode, Nilgiris, Salem, Dharmapuri, Karur, Namakkal, Dindigul and Krishnagiri. This place was known as Thirupukkoliyur in the Sangam era. It is one of the seven Shivastalams in Kongu Nadu; however this temple is better known as Karunaiyaaththaal temple. Avinashi is also referred to in inscriptions as Dakshina Varanasi, Tiruppukkozhiyur etc. Tirumular's Tirumantiram, Arunagirinathar's Tiruppugazh and Manikkavasakar's Tiruvasakam refer to this shrine.

Geography 
Avinashi has an average elevation of 313 metres (1030 feet).

Avinashi is a suburb of Tiruppur located on the arterial road connecting the textile cities of Tirupur, Erode and Coimbatore. It is known for the Shiva temple constructed by Sundarapandiya and is closely associated with the Saiva saint Sundaramoorthy Nayanar.

Demographics
According to the 2011 census, the taluk of Avinashi had a population of 337923 with 168055  males and 169868 females. There were 1011 women for every 1000 men. The taluk had a literacy rate of 68.05. Child population in the age group below 6 was 15424 Males and 14709 Females.

Transport 

The nearest airport is the Coimbatore International Airport, which is about 32 km away from the town. There is no rail transport to the town. The nearest Railway Station is at Tirupur, which is about 12 km away from Avinashi. The key public mass transport for the people here is the Buses run by the State Government & Private Sector thus providing a competitive service to the people.

Landmark

 
Tiruppukkozhiyur (Avinashilingeshwarar) temple is a protected monument under the Archaeological survey of India.

Industries
There are many textile mills located in and around this town. These textile mills comprise spinning and weaving mills that work closing with various apparel manufacturing companies, the major one being S.P.Apparels ltd. There are also many engineering industries. Agriculture is the major occupation of many of the people in and around this city.

Notable people

Ayyasamy Dharun is an Indian track athlete. He specialises in the 400 metres and the 400 metres hurdles events. He participated in the 4 × 400 metres relay event at the 2016 Summer Olympics. He won silver medal in 400m hurdles in Asian games held in 2018.

P. Dhanapal, Member of legistivate Assembly and former Speaker of Tamil Nadu Legislative Assembly.

Festivals
This temple's car is the second biggest in India, after the one in Tiruvarur  and is noted for its fine wooden carvings. Since the old car was destroyed by fire in 90's, it has been rebuilt. The annual Bhrammotsavam is celebrated in the month of Chittirai. Apart from Temple car festival,  'Arubathi moovar (63 Naayanmaars) Ula' is one of the notable festival in this temple. The festival chariot here is said to be on par with Tiruvarur. Previously it was a 10-day festival, but now it is celebrated for 2 days. There are two temple cars, the wheels of the cars are made of iron. In earlier days, the car was pulled by people alone, now bulldozers help to move the car. The traffic in the Avinashi road is increasing day by day, and because of this, the temple management is thinking of moving the car from the road side to some other place near the temple.

See also
Thandukkaran palayam

References

Neighbourhoods and suburbs of Tiruppur